Île-Tudy is a commune in the Finistère department of Brittany in northwestern France.

Population
Inhabitants of Île-Tudy are called in French Îliens.

History
The United States Navy established a naval air station on 14 March 1918 to operate seaplanes during World War I. The base closed shortly after the First Armistice at Compiègne.

See also
Communes of the Finistère department

References

External links
Official website 
Mayors of Finistère Association 

Communes of Finistère
Populated coastal places in France